Pedro Nicolás Bermúdez Villamizar, C.I.M. (8 June 1929 – 27 October 2022) was a Venezuelan Roman Catholic prelate.

Bermúdez Villamizar was born in Venezuela and was ordained to the priesthood in 1953. He served as titular bishop of Lamsorti and auxiliary bishop of the Archdiocese of Caracas from 1997 until his retirement in 2009.

References

1929 births
2022 deaths
Venezuelan Roman Catholic bishops
Eudist bishops
Bishops appointed by Pope John Paul II
People from Rubio, Venezuela